The Premiere Collection: The Best of Andrew Lloyd Webber is a 1988 compilation album, bringing together some of composer Andrew Lloyd Webber's best known compositions at the time of release. It includes songs from the musicals The Phantom of the Opera, Tell Me on a Sunday, Evita, Cats, Jesus Christ Superstar, Starlight Express and Requiem. Co-writers of the songs include Tim Rice, Don Black, Richard Stilgoe, Charles Hart and Trevor Nunn.

The album spent two weeks at number one in the UK Compilation Chart in January 1989.

It was released by Really Useful Records and Polydor on LP (with a gatefold cover), cassette and CD.

Track listing

Side one
 "The Phantom of the Opera" - Sarah Brightman & Steve Harley - 4:37 (from The Phantom of the Opera)
 "Take That Look Off Your Face" - Marti Webb - 3:56 (from Tell Me on a Sunday)
 "All I Ask of You" - Sarah Brightman & Cliff Richard - 4:05 (from The Phantom of the Opera)
 "Don't Cry for Me, Argentina" - Julie Covington - 4:02 (from Evita)
 "Magical Mr. Mistoffelees" - Paul Nicholas - 5:10 (from Cats)
 "Four Variations for Cello & Orchestra" - Julian Lloyd Webber - 4:12 (from Song and Dance)
 "Superstar" - Murray Head & Cast - 3:56 (from Jesus Christ Superstar)

Side two
 "Memory" - Elaine Paige - 4:26 (from Cats)
 "Starlight Express" - Ray Shell - 5:02 (from Starlight Express)
 "Tell Me on a Sunday" - Marti Webb - 3:30 (from Tell Me on a Sunday)
 "The Music of the Night" - Michael Crawford - 5:12 (from The Phantom of the Opera)
 "Another Suitcase in Another Hall" - Barbara Dickson - 3:18 (from Evita)
 "I Don't Know How to Love Him" - Yvonne Elliman - 3:56 (from Jesus Christ Superstar)
 "Pie Jesu" - Sarah Brightman & Paul Miles-Kingston - 3:58 (from Requiem)

Charts

Certifications and sales

References 

1988 greatest hits albums
Classical crossover albums
Albums produced by Andrew Lloyd Webber
Andrew Lloyd Webber albums